Gonzalo Orlando Díaz Nachar (born 1 March 1990) is an Argentine professional footballer who plays as a midfielder for Tacuarembó in Uruguay.

Career

Early career
Gonzalo Díaz was born in Mendoza, Argentina, where he began his professional career with local club Godoy Cruz in 2008 at the age of 18. Díaz took part in the team's youth system but did not break through until 2014 when he made 19 appearances for the team. Before that he had unsuccessful loan spells with Defensa y Justicia, Atletico Racing Cordoba Instituto and Lanús.

América (loan)
On 17 June 2014, Díaz joined Mexican side Club América on a year-long loan, with the club having an option to purchase the player at the end of the loan. He made his league debut on 3 August against Puebla, replacing Michael Arroyo in the 80th minute, with América winning the match 4–0. On 18 September, Díaz scored his first goal for América during the CONCACAF Champions League group-stage match against Puerto Rico Bayamón, scoring the fourth goal in a 10–1 win.

On 4 December, during the first-leg of the semifinal match against Monterrey, Díaz suffered an injury that would leave him out for the remainder of the Apertura tournament, as well as the 2015 Clausura.

Honors
América
Liga MX (1): Apertura 2014
CONCACAF Champions league 2014-2015

References

External links
Profile at Vélez Sarsfield's official website 

1990 births
Living people
Argentine footballers
Argentine expatriate footballers
Club Atlético Lanús footballers
Instituto footballers
Club América footballers
Godoy Cruz Antonio Tomba footballers
Club Atlético Vélez Sarsfield footballers
Defensa y Justicia footballers
Club Tijuana footballers
Tacuarembó F.C. players
Argentine Primera División players
Primera Nacional players
Liga MX players
Uruguayan Segunda División players
Argentine expatriate sportspeople in Mexico
Argentine expatriate sportspeople in Uruguay
Expatriate footballers in Mexico
Expatriate footballers in Uruguay
Association football wingers
Sportspeople from Mendoza Province